The North Macedonia women's national under-16 basketball team is a national basketball team of North Macedonia, administered by the Basketball Federation of North Macedonia. It represents the country in women's international under-16 basketball competitions.

FIBA U16 Women's European Championship participations

See also
North Macedonia women's national basketball team
North Macedonia women's national under-18 basketball team
North Macedonia men's national under-16 basketball team

References

External links
Archived records of North Macedonia team participations

Basketball in North Macedonia
Basketball
Women's national under-16 basketball teams